This is a list of television serial dramas released by TVB in 2013.

Top ten drama series in ratings
The following is a list of the highest-rated drama series released by TVB in 2013. The list includes premiere week, final week ratings, as well as the average overall count of live Hong Kong viewers (in millions). The top five include overall ratings across all platforms.

Notes
A  Average numbers are derived from consolidated ratings as reported by Nielsen and on TVB's annual report. A consolidated rating is defined as the summation of TV ratings, online live rating, and online catch-up rating.

Awards

First line-up
These dramas air in Hong Kong from 8:00pm to 8:30pm, Monday to Friday on Jade.

Second line-up
These dramas air in Hong Kong from 8:30pm to 9:30pm, Monday to Friday on Jade.

Third line-up
These dramas air in Hong Kong from 9:30pm to 10:30pm, Monday to Friday on Jade.

Notes 
Inbound Troubles 老表，你好嘢！; Copyright notice: 2012.
Sergeant Tabloid 女警愛作戰; Released overseas on April 2, 2012. Copyright notice: 2012.
Bullet Brain 神探高倫布; Copyright notice: 2012.

References

External links
TVB.com Official Website 

2012
2013 in Hong Kong television
2013 in Chinese television